Charles Edward "Ed" Stauffer (January 10, 1898 – July 2, 1979) was a Major League Baseball pitcher.

External links

1898 births
1979 deaths
People from Emsworth, Pennsylvania
St. Louis Browns players
Major League Baseball pitchers
Baseball players from Pennsylvania
Augusta Tygers players
Beaumont Exporters players
Bridgeport Americans players
Fort Smith Twins players
Hartford Senators players
Milwaukee Brewers (minor league) players
Muskogee Chiefs players
Peoria Tractors players
Springfield Senators players
Wichita Falls Spudders players